Kaliaganj  (also spelled as Kaliyaganj) is a town and a municipality in Uttar Dinajpur district in the Indian state of West Bengal. Late politician  Priya Ranjan Dasmunsi  belonged from this town. Today Kaliyaganj is a growing business and commerce region in North Dinajpur district, with rapid urbanisation and improved roadways.

Etymology
The word "Kaliyaganj" is come from the word "Kaliya" means "Krishna", the character of Mahabharata.

Geography

Police station
Kaliaganj police station under West Bengal police has jurisdiction over Kaliaganj town and  Kaliaganj CD block. It is 22 km from the district headquarters and covers an area of 301.9 km2.There is a Town Outpost under this PS.

CD block HQ
The headquarters of Kaliaganj CD block is at Kaliaganj town.

In the map alongside, all places marked on the map are linked in the full screen version.

Demographics
As per the 2011 Census of India, Kaliaganj had a total population of 53,530, of which 27,321 (51%) were males and 26,209 (49%) were females. Population below 6 years was 5,105. The total number of literates in Kaliaganj was 41,622 (85.95% of the population over 6 years).

Transport
Kaliaganj has a station on the  Barsoi-Radhikapur branch line.

New broad gauge line from Kaliaganj to Buniadpur (33.10 km) was included in the budget 2010-11.  157.938 ha of land is to be acquired. As of August 2018, project work by Northeast Frontier Railway is held up mainly because of paucity of funds.

State Highway No. 10A, running from Buniadpur to Raiganj passes through Kaliaganj town.

Education
 Kaliyaganj College was established in 1968. Affiliated  to the University of Gour Banga, it offers honours courses in Bengali, English, Hindi, Sanskrit, political science, history, philosophy, economics, physics, chemistry, mathematics, computer science and accounting, and general courses in arts, science and commerce.
 Kaliyaganj College of Education at Krishnabati, Kaliyaganj, offers B.Ed. and D.El.Ed. courses.
 Kaliyaganj Parbati Sundari High School is a co-educational higher secondary school at Schoolpara, Kaliyaganj. Established in 1931, it has arrangements for teaching from class V to XII.
 Kaliyaganj Milanmayee Girls’ High School is a girls only higher secondary school at Schoolpara, Kaliyaganj. Established in 1949, it has arrangements for teaching from class VI to XII.
 Kaliyaganj Sarala Sundari High School.
 Kaliyaganj Manomohan Girls' High School is a girls' school situated at Roy Colony, Kaliyaganj. It is a higher secondary school and was established by Shri Makhanlal Saha in 1968
 Puria Maheshpur High School

Healthcare
Kaliaganj State General Hospital, with 60 beds is a major medical facility at Kaliaganj.

Tourist spots 
Loknath Mandir Kaliyaganj

Radhikapur

Notable people
 Priya Ranjan Dasmunsi - Former Union Minister.

References

Cities and towns in Uttar Dinajpur district
Cities in West Bengal